Dark of Night is an American dramatic anthology series that aired on the DuMont Television Network on Fridays at 8:30pm EST from October 3, 1952, to May 1, 1953. 

The series starred mostly unknown actors. In it, the character known as "The Stranger" traveled to a different site each week in order to solve a crime. Each episode was filmed at a different location in the New York City area. , Locations included a Coca-Cola bottling plant, Brentano's book store in Manhattan, a castle in New Jersey, and the American Red Cross Blood Bank. Dark of Night was one of the first network dramas to use such locations, which saved money for the network.

Production
Dark of Night was broadcast live. Frank Bunetta was the producer and director.

Episode status
Though most episodes of DuMont series were eventually destroyed, the UCLA Film and Television Archive has one episode of Dark of Night.

See also
List of programs broadcast by the DuMont Television Network
List of surviving DuMont Television Network broadcasts
1952-53 United States network television schedule
at CVTA with episode list

References

External links

DuMont historical website
Dark of Night at CVTA with episode list

1952 American television series debuts
1953 American television series endings
1950s American anthology television series
1950s American drama television series
Black-and-white American television shows
DuMont Television Network original programming
English-language television shows